Ryan Baird (born 26 July 1999) is an Irish rugby union player, who plays for Leinster Rugby in the United Rugby Championship and European Rugby Champions Cup. He plays as a lock and sometimes flanker.

Early life
Baird attended The High School for three years before moving to St Michael's College and, alongside Leinster teammate Scott Penny, was a standout performer during the 2018 Leinster Schools Rugby Senior Cup.

Leinster
Strong performances at school level saw Baird rewarded with a place in Leinster's academy ahead of the 2018–19 season, and he made his senior competitive debut for the province in their 14–13 defeat against Ulster during round 21 of the 2018–19 Pro14 on 27 April 2019. Many see him as the natural successor to Peter Lennon in the DUFC second row.
Baird played as a substitute for Leinster in September 2020 in a European Rugby Champions Cup match against Saracens, earning a place in the match day 23 ahead of Australian international Scott Fardy.

Ireland Under-20
Baird was selected to play in the Ireland under-20s squad for the 2019 Six Nations Under 20s Championship, Baird made two substitute appearances during the tournament; against France and Wales, as Ireland secured their first grand slam in the tournament since 2007. He was retained in the under-20s squad for the 2019 World Rugby Under 20 Championship, and started in the 46–26 opening win against England, but, during the second pool fixture against Australia, Baird was shown a red card for a high tackle.

Ireland
In October 2020, he was named in the Ireland squad by coach Andy Farrell for the remaining matches of the 2020 Six Nations Championship. On 27 February 2021, Baird made his debut off the bench in 10–48 victory over Italy in the third round of the 2021 Six Nations. He scored his first international try for Ireland in a 57–6 win over Italy during the 2022 Six Nations.

International Tries 
As of 1 March 2022

References

External links

Leinster Academy Profile
Ireland U20 Profile
U20 Six Nations Profile
Pro14 Profile

1999 births
Living people
Rugby union players from Dublin (city)
Irish rugby union players
Dublin University Football Club players
Leinster Rugby players
Rugby union locks
Ireland international rugby union players